The Cruel Tower is a 1956 American adventure film directed by Lew Landers and written by Warren Douglas. It is based on the 1955 novel The Cruel Tower by William Brown Hartley. The film stars John Ericson, Mari Blanchard, Charles McGraw, Steve Brodie, Peter Whitney and Alan Hale Jr. The film was released on October 28, 1956, by Allied Artists Pictures.

Plot

Cast          
John Ericson as Tom Kittredge
Mari Blanchard as Mary 'The Babe' Thompson
Charles McGraw as Harry 'Stretch' Clay
Steve Brodie as Casey
Peter Whitney as 'Joss' Jossman
Alan Hale Jr. as Rocky Milliken 
Diana Darrin as Kit
Carol Kelly as Waitress
Barbara Bell Wright as Rev. Claver

References

External links
 

1956 films
1950s English-language films
American adventure films
1956 adventure films
Allied Artists films
Films directed by Lew Landers
1950s American films
American black-and-white films